Roberto Pregadio (6 December 1928 – 15 November 2010) was an Italian composer, conductor and TV-personality.

Born in Catania and graduated in piano at the Conservatory of Naples, in 1960 Pregadio became a pianist in the RAI Light Music Orchestra.  From the second half of the sixties, for about fifteen years, he composed and directed about fifty musical scores.

As composer he was probably best known for the whistled musical score for the 1969 Spaghetti Western The Forgotten Pistolero, that he composed with Franco Micalizzi and that was later used in several episodes of The Ren & Stimpy Show.

In Italy he was also well known as the partner of Corrado Mantoni, from 1968 to 1997, and later of Gerry Scotti until 2007, in the radio and TV show La corrida.

Selected filmography

 Kriminal (1966) 
 Our Men in Bagdad (1966) 
 The Glass Sphinx (1967)  
 The Last Killer (1967)  
 A Hole in the Forehead (1968)  
 Ciccio Forgives, I Don't (1968)  
 King of Kong Island (1968)  
 Brutti di notte (1968)  
 Satanik (1968)
 The Forgotten Pistolero (1969)  
 Franco, Ciccio e il pirata Barbanera (1969)  
 Paths of War (1970) 
 Erika (1971)
 Smile Before Death (1972) 
 Death Carries a Cane (1973)  
 Catene (1974)  
 La minorenne (1974)  
 So Young, So Lovely, So Vicious... (1975)  
 That Malicious Age (1975)  
 SS Experiment Camp (1976) 
 Il medico... la studentessa (1976) 
 Seagulls Fly Low (1978)
 The Last House on the Beach (1978)
 Mondo Cannibale (1980)

References

External links 
 
 Roberto Pregadio at Discogs

1928 births
Italian film score composers
Italian male film score composers
Spaghetti Western composers
Mass media people from Catania
Italian television personalities
2010 deaths
20th-century Italian musicians
20th-century Italian male musicians
Musicians from Catania